Amendments to the Rome Statute of the International Criminal Court must be proposed, adopted, and ratified in accordance with articles 121 and 122 of the Statute. Any state party to the Statute can propose an amendment. The proposed amendment can be adopted by a two-thirds majority vote in either a meeting of the Assembly of States Parties or a review conference called by the Assembly. An amendment comes into force for all states parties one year after it is ratified by seven-eighths of the states parties. However, any amendment to articles 5, 6, 7, or 8 of the Statute only enters into force for states parties that have ratified the amendment. A state party which ratifies an amendment to articles 5, 6, 7, or 8 is subject to that amendment one year after ratifying it, regardless of how many other states parties have also ratified it. For an article 5, 6, 7, or 8 amendment, the Statute itself is amended after the amendment comes into force for the first state party to ratify it. Amendments of a purely institutional nature enter into force six months after they are approved by a two-thirds majority vote in either a meeting of the Assembly of States Parties or a review conference.

Summary of adopted amendments to the Rome Statute 
In June 2010, two amendments to the Rome Statute of the International Criminal Court were adopted by the Review Conference in Kampala, Uganda. The first amendment criminalizes the use of certain kinds of weapons in non-international conflicts whose use was already forbidden in international conflicts. The second amendment defines the crime of aggression. It entered into force in May 2013, but its activation was tied to two conditions, which were met in July 2018. In November 2015, an additional amendment to remove article 124 from the Statute was adopted during the 14th meeting of the Assembly of States Parties in The Hague in the Netherlands. In December 2017, three amendments to article 8 were adopted at the 12th meeting of the Assembly of States Parties in New York City. In December 2019, one additional amendment to article 8 was adopted by the Assembly of States Parties in The Hague.

Amendment to article 8 (2010)

Summary 
An amendment to article 8 was adopted on 10 June 2010 at the Review Conference of the Rome Statute in Kampala, Uganda. The amendment had originally been proposed by Belgium and it was forwarded to the Review Conference by the eighth session of the Assembly of States Parties.

The amendment adds to article 8(2)(e) three clauses which make it a war crime to employ poison, "asphyxiating, poisonous or other gases, and all analogous liquids, materials or devices," or expanding bullets in an armed conflict not of an international character. The Rome Statute already makes the use of such means of warfare a war crime in international armed conflicts.

States parties to the amendment 
Because the amendment is to article 8, it will come into force only for those states parties which have ratified it, one year after doing so. As of January 2023, 45 states parties have ratified the document. The Rome Statute itself was amended on 26 September 2012 after the amendment came into force for the first state party to ratify it.

Amendments on the crime of aggression (2010)

Summary 
Amendments on the crime of aggression were adopted on 11 June 2010 at the Review Conference of the Rome Statute in Kampala, Uganda. The amendments were proposed by Liechtenstein, which chaired the Special Working Group on the Crime of Aggression, the committee directed by the Assembly of States Parties to form a definition for the crime of aggression, which was originally absent from the Statute.

The amendments define the crime of aggression in accordance with United Nations General Assembly Resolution 3314. Acts of aggression are: invading another state; bombing another state; blockading the ports or coastlines of another state; attacking the land, sea, or air forces, or marine or sea fleets of another state; violating a status of forces agreement; using armed bands, groups, irregulars or mercenaries against another state; allowing territory to be used by another state to perpetrate an act of aggression against a third state.

While the amendments come into force one year after being ratified, the amended text says that only crimes of aggression committed one year or more after the thirtieth ratification are within the jurisdiction of the Court. Furthermore, a decision had to be taken by the Assembly of States Parties with a two-thirds majority vote after 1 January 2017 to actually activate jurisdiction. On 26 June 2016, the State of Palestine became the 30th state party to ratify the amendment, thus ensuring that the first condition would be fulfilled. On 14 December 2017, the Assembly of States Parties adopted a resolution fulfilling the second condition, activating the Court's jurisdiction over the crime of aggression as of 17 July 2018.

While upon a United Nations Security Council referral the Prosecutor can open an investigation against the national of any state, this is not the case with state referral and proprio motu investigations by the Prosecutor. A state party can opt out of these amendments, and nationals of non-states parties are not subject to the Court's jurisdiction. Additionally, the Prosecutor must wait for a determination of the Security Council regarding an act of aggression. If the Security Council determines an act of aggression has taken place, the Prosecutor may proceed. If the Security Council does not act within six months, the Prosecutor can proceed provided that a Pre-Trial Chamber approves that move. The Security Council keeps its right to defer investigations for a period of one year.

States parties to the amendment 
As of October 2022, 44 states parties have ratified the amendment. The Rome Statute itself was amended on 8 May 2013 after the amendment came into force for the first state party to ratify it. The Court gained jurisdiction over the crime of aggression on 17 July 2018.

Amendment to article 124 (2015) 
On 26 November 2015 during their 14th meeting, the Assembly of States Parties adopted the amendment to article 124 in The Hague in the Netherlands. The amendment deletes article 124 from the Rome Statute. Article 124 is a transitional provision, which allows a state, upon becoming party to the Statute, to declare that it does not accept the jurisdiction of the Court over war crimes committed in its territory or by its nationals for a period of seven years.

States parties to the amendment 
As of March 2022, 18 state parties have ratified the amendment. Per article 121(4) of the Rome Statute, this amendment will enter into force for all state parties to the Rome Statute one year after seven-eighths of states parties (currently 108 states parties) have ratified it.

Amendment to article 8 (biological weapons) (2017) 
On 14 December 2017, during their 16th meeting the Assembly of States Parties adopted the amendment to article 8. The amendment inserted an article defining the use of weapons which use microbial or other biological agents, or toxins as a war crime.

States parties to the amendment 
Because the amendment is to article 8, it will come into force only for those states parties which have ratified it, one year after doing so. As of January 2023, 14 state parties have ratified the amendment. The Rome Statute itself was amended on 2 April 2020 after the amendment came into force for the first state party to ratify it.

Amendment to article 8 (non-detectable fragments) (2017) 
On 14 December 2017, during their 16th meeting the Assembly of States Parties adopted the amendment to article 8. The amendment inserted an article defining the use of weapons the primary effect of which is to injure by fragments undetectable by x-rays in the human body as a war crime.

States parties to the amendment 
Because the amendment is to article 8, it will come into force only for those states parties which have ratified it, one year after doing so. As of January 2023, 12 state parties have ratified the amendment. The Rome Statute itself was amended on 2 April 2020 after the amendment came into force for the first state party to ratify it.

Amendment to article 8 (blinding laser weapons) (2017) 
On 14 December 2017, during their 16th meeting the Assembly of States Parties adopted the amendment to article 8. The amendment inserted an article defining the use of blinding laser weapons as a war crime.

States parties to the amendment 
Because the amendment is to article 8, it will come into force only for those states parties which have ratified it, one year after doing so. As of January 2023, 12 state parties have ratified the amendment. The Rome Statute itself was amended on 2 April 2020 after the amendment came into force for the first state party to ratify it.

Amendment to article 8 (starvation of civilians) (2019) 
On 6 December 2019, at its ninth plenary meeting, the Assembly of States Parties adopted the amendment to article 8 defining the war crime of the intentional use of starvation of civilians as a method of warfare in armed conflicts not of an international character.

States parties to the amendment 
Because the amendment is to article 8, it will come into force only for those states parties which have ratified it, one year after doing so. As of December 2022, 11 state parties have ratified the amendment. The Rome Statute itself was amended on 14 October 2021 after the amendment comes into force for the first state party to ratify it.

Proposed amendments 
A number of amendments have been proposed by states parties, but have either not been considered or adopted by the Assembly:

African Union states parties have proposed allowing a state party that has jurisdiction over a situation before the Court to ask the United Nations Security Council to defer the matter, or alternatively, if the Security Council fails to make a decision the state party can ask the United Nations General Assembly to defer the matter.
Kenya proposed several amendments, including making sitting heads of state immune from prosecution, subjecting ICC authorities to prosecution for crimes against the administration of justice, and granting the Independent Oversight Mechanism more authority.
Mexico has proposed making the use or threat of use of nuclear weapons a war crime.
The Netherlands has proposed adding terrorism as a prosecutable crime.
Norway has proposed establishing a mechanism for allowing international or regional organizations to play a role in the enforcement of sentences.
Trinidad and Tobago and Belize have proposed adding international drug trafficking as a prosecutable crime.

Notes

References 

Rome Statute of the International Criminal Court
2010 in Uganda
Treaties concluded in 2010